Nicole Arendt and Manon Bollegraf were the defending champions but only Arendt competed that year with Natasha Zvereva.

Arendt and Zvereva lost in the final 7–5, 6–4 against Martina Hingis and Helena Suková.

Seeds
Champion seeds are indicated in bold text while text in italics indicates the round in which those seeds were eliminated.

 Nicole Arendt /  Natasha Zvereva (final)
 Martina Hingis /  Helena Suková (champions)
 Lori McNeil /  Gabriela Sabatini (semifinals)
 Larisa Savchenko /  Nathalie Tauziat (quarterfinals)

Draw

External links
 1996 Barilla Indoors Doubles draw

Zurich Open
1996 WTA Tour